Hale may refer to:

Places

Australia
Hale, Northern Territory, a locality
Hale River,  in southeastern Northern Territory

Canada
Hale, Ontario, in Algoma District

United Kingdom
Hale, Cumbria, a hamlet near Beetham, Cumbria
Hale, Greater Manchester, a village in the Metropolitan Borough of Trafford, Greater Manchester
Hale (Trafford ward), a former electoral ward in the Metropolitan Borough of Trafford, Greater Manchester
Hale, Halton, a village in Halton, Cheshire
Hale, an electoral ward in the Borough of Halton, Cheshire
Hale, Hampshire, a village in the New Forest
Hale, Surrey, a village near Farnham
Great Hale, a village in the North Kesteven district of Lincolnshire
Little Hale, a hamlet in the North Kesteven district of Lincolnshire
Tottenham Hale, a district in the London Borough of Haringey
The Hale, an area of the London Borough of Barnet
Hale, an electoral ward in the London Borough of Barnet
The Hale, Buckinghamshire, a hamlet near Wendover

United States
Hale, Colorado, an unincorporated community in Yuma County, Colorado
Hale, Iowa, an unincorporated community in Jones County, Iowa
Hale, Kansas, an unincorporated community in Salt Creek Township, Chautauqua County, Kansas
Hale (Massachusetts), an educational and recreation organization in Westwood, Massachusetts
Hale, a small community within Plainfield Township, Iosco County, Michigan
Hale, Missouri, a city in Carroll County, Missouri
Hale, Utah, a ghost town in Carbon County, Utah
Hale, Wisconsin, a town in Trempealeau County, Wisconsin
Hale (community), Wisconsin, an unincorporated community in the town of Hale
Hale, Minneapolis, a neighborhood near the southern edge of Minneapolis
Mount Hale (New Hampshire), a mountain located in Grafton County, New Hampshire
Hale County, Alabama
Hale County, Texas

Poland
Hałe, a village in Gmina Sokółka, Sokółka County, Podlaskie Voivodeship

Tanzania
Hale, Tanzania, a town in Korogwe district

Astronomy and space
Hale telescope,  telescope at Palomar Observatory in California
60-inch Hale, a  telescope at Mount Wilson Observatory in California
Hale (lunar crater), a crater on the Moon
Hale (Martian crater), a crater on Mars

People
Hale (given name), includes a list of people with given name Hale
Hale (surname), includes a list of people with surname Hale

Other uses
Hale (band), alternative rock band in the Philippines
Hale (album), by the band Hale
High-altitude long endurance (HALE), a type of air-borne vehicle
Healthy life expectancy (HALE), a World Health Organization statistic for life expectancy
Hale School, an independent boys' school in Perth, Western Australia
Camp Hale, a former U.S. Army training facility in Colorado
Hawaiian hale, Hawaiian architectural style

See also
 HALE (disambiguation)
 The Hale (disambiguation)
 Hale High School (disambiguation)
 Hales, a small village in Norfolk, England
 Hales Corners, Wisconsin a village in Milwaukee County, Wisconsin, U.S.
 Hales (surname)
 Halle (disambiguation)
 Hayle, a small town in Cornwall, England
 McHale (surname)
Honolulu Hale, the official seat of government of the city and county of Honolulu, Hawaii
Hale's Ales, a brewery in Seattle, Washington, U.S.